This is a list of earthquakes in 1971. Only magnitude 6.0 or greater earthquakes appear on the list. Lower magnitude events are included if they have caused death, injury or damage. Events which occurred in remote areas will be excluded from the list as they wouldn't have generated significant media interest. All dates are listed according to UTC time. Maximum intensities are indicated on the Mercalli intensity scale and are sourced from United States Geological Survey (USGS) ShakeMap data. Like the previous year, 1971 had heightened seismic activity. 20 earthquakes exceeded magnitude 7 with 2 of those measuring above magnitude 8. Both of the magnitude 8 events happened within a 12-day span in July in Papua New Guinea. A fairly robust aftershock sequence followed which contributed to the number of magnitude 7+ events. Chile, Russia and Indonesia had significant events during the year. The deadliest earthquake accounting for the vast majority of the 1,290 fatalities occurred in Turkey in May. 1,000 died in this event coming not long after another deadly event elsewhere in the country. In February, Los Angeles, California was jolted by one of its largest events resulting in 65 deaths.

Overall

By death toll 

 Note: At least 10 casualties

By magnitude 

 Note: At least 7.0 magnitude

Notable events

January

February

March

April

May

June

July

August

September

October

November

December

References

1971
 
1971